Nicknames are common among jazz musicians. Nicknames and sobriquets can also sometimes become stage names, and there are several cases of performers being known almost exclusively by their nicknames as opposed to their given names. Some of the most notable nicknames and stage names are listed here.

Although the term Jazz royalty exists for "Kings" and similar royal or aristocratic nicknames, there is a wide range of other terms, many of them obscure. Where the origin of the nickname is known, this is explained at each artist's corresponding article.

List of jazz nicknames

A
 Abbey: Abbey Lincoln
 Abbie: Albert Brunies
 Ace: Ace Harris
 Angry Man of Jazz (The): Charles Mingus
 Ananias Garibaldi: A.G. Godley

B
 Babs: Babs Gonzales
 Baby: Warren Dodds
 Baby Sweets: Walter Perkins
 Bags: Milt Jackson
 Barney: Barney Bigard
 Barney: Barney Wilen
 Baron: Charles Mingus
 Bass: Ernest Hill
 Bean: Coleman Hawkins a.k.a. "Hawk"
 Bear (The): Eddie Costa
 Beaver: Beaver Harris
 Betty Bebop: Betty Carter
 Benny: Benny Bailey
 Big Babe: Andrew Webb
 Big Bill: Big Bill Bissonnette
 Big Chief: Big Chief Russell Moore
 Big Daddy: Eric Dixon
 Big-Eye: Louis Nelson Delisle
 Big Jim: Jim Robinson
 Big Joe: Big Joe Turner
 Big John: John Patton
 Big Mama: Big Mama Thornton
 Big Nick: Big Nick Nicholas
 Big Sid: Sid Catlett
 Billie: Billie Holiday a.k.a. "Lady Day"
 Bing: Bing Crosby
 Bird: Charlie Parker a.k.a. "Yardbird"
 Bix: Leon Bismarck Beiderbecke, though it appears his given names were Leon Bix.
 Blood: James "Blood" Ulmer
 Blue: Richard Allen "Blue" Mitchell
 Blue Lou: Lou Marini
 Blow It: J. T. Brown aka Nature Boy Brown
 Bobo: Bobo Stenson
 Bogey: Wilton Gaynair
 Bones: Tom Malone
 Boogaloo Joe: Ivan "Boogaloo Joe" Jones
 Boogaloo: James "Boogaloo" Bolden
 Book: Booker Ervin
 Boots: Clifford Douglas 
 Boots: Boots Mussulli
 Bootsie: Bootsie Barnes
 Booty: Booty Wood
 Bops Junior: Oliver Jackson
 Bounce: George Mraz
 Brick: Brick Fleagle
 Brother: Brother Jack McDuff
 Brother Ray: Ray Charles, aka "The High Priest"
 Brownie: Clifford Brown
 Brute (The), Frog: Ben Webster
 Bruz: Bruz Freeman
 Bu: Art Blakey took the name "Abdullah Ibn Buhaina" after a reported trip to Africa. Friends shortened it to "Bu"
 Bubba: Bubba Brooks
 Bubber: James "Bubber" Miley
 Buck: Leroy Berry
 Buck: Wilbur Clayton
 Buck: Buck Hill
 Bucky: Bucky Pizzarelli
 Bud: Bud Brisbois
 Bud: Bud Freeman
 Bud: Bud Powell
 Bud: Bud Shank
 Budd: Budd Johnson (not to be confused with Buddy Johnson)
 Buddie: Buddie Petit
 Buddy: Bernard Anderson a.k.a. "Step-Buddy"
 Buddy: Buddy Banks (bassist)
 Buddy: Buddy Banks (saxophonist)
 Buddy: Buddy Bolden a.k.a. "King"
 Buddy: Buddy Catlett
 Buddy: Buddy Childers
 Buddy: Buddy Clark
 Buddy: Buddy Collette
 Buddy: Buddy DeFranco
 Buddy: Buddy Featherstonhaugh
 Buddy: Buddy Johnson (not to be confused with Budd Johnson)
 Buddy: Buddy Montgomery
 Buddy: Buddy Morrow
 Buddy: Buddy Rich
 Buddy: Buddy Tate
 Buddy: Buddy Williams
 Bumps: Robert Blackwell
 Bunk: Bunk Johnson
 Bunky: Bunky Green
 Bunny: Rowland Berigan
 Buster: Buster Bailey
 Buster: Buster Bennett a.k.a. "Leap Frog" Bennett
 Buster: Buster Cooper
 Buster: Buster Harding
 Buster: Buster Smith a.k.a. "Professor"
 Buster: Buster Williams
 Buster: Buster Wilson
 Butter: Quentin Jackson
 Butch: Butch Ballard
 Butch: Butch Miles
 Butch: Butch Morris
 Buzzy: Buzzy Drootin

C
 Cab: Cab Kaye
 Cag: Cag Cagnolatti
 Cake: Al "Cake" Wichard
 Candy: Otis Finch
 Candy: Floyd "Candy" Johnson
 Cannonball: Julian Adderley
 Captain: Captain John Handy
 Cat: William Alonzo Anderson
 Cat (The): Jimmy Smith
 Chairman of the Board: Frank Sinatra a.k.a. "Ol' Blue Eyes", "The Voice"
 Chick: Chick Corea
 Chick: Chick Webb
 Chico: Alfred "Chico" Alvarez
 Chico: Chico Freeman
 Chico: Chico O'Farrill
 Chink: Chink Martin
 Chippie: Bertha Hill
 Chu: Leon "Chu" Berry
 Chubby: Chubby Jackson
 Chummy: Chummy MacGregor
 Cie: Cie Frazier
 Cleanhead: Eddie Vinson
 Clyde: Clyde Lombardi
 Conte: Conte Candoli
 Coop: Bob Cooper
 Cootie: Charles Williams
 Corky: Corky Corcoran
 Corky: Corky Cornelius
 Cornbread: Hal Singer
 Count: Count Basie
 Count (The): Conte Candoli
 Count (The): Steve Marcus
 Cow Cow: Charles Edward Davenport
 Cozy: Cozy Cole
 Crane: Dave Burns
 Crazy: Chris Columbus
 Cutty: Cutty Cutshall

D
 Dee: Dee Barton
 Dee Dee: Dee Dee Bridgewater
 Deedles: Diane Schuur
 Dewey: Dewey Redman
 Dicky: Dicky Wells
 Dink: Dink Johnson
 Dink: Harold Taylor 
 Dippermouth: Louis Armstrong a.k.a. "Satchmo", "Pops", "Satchel Mouth", "Dipper Mouth"
 Divine One (The): Sarah Vaughan a.k.a. "Sassy"
 Diz: Diz Disley
 Dizzy, or Diz: John Birks Gillespie
 Dizzy: Dizzy Reece
 Django: Jean Baptiste Reinhardt
 Doc: Doc Cheatham
 Doc: Doc Cook
 Doc: Doc Evans
 Doc: Doc Goldberg
 Doc: Doc Souchon
 Doc: Doc West
 Doctor Miller: Glenn Miller
 Dodo: Michael Marmarosa
 Dollar: Dollar Brand
 Dolo: Dolo Coker
 Duck: Donald Bailey
 Dud: Dud Bascomb
 Duke: Duke Ellington
 Duke: Duke Groner
 Duke: Duke Jordan
 Duke (The): Bennie Green
 Duke: Duke Pearson

E
 Eddie Lang: Salvatore Massaro
 Eubie: Eubie Blake
 Ella: Ella Fitzgerald

F
 Fat Boy: Fats Navarro
 Fat Girl: Fats Navarro
 Fatha: Earl Hines
 Fathead: David Newman
 Fats: Jimmy Ponder
 Fats: Fats Sadi
 Fats Waller: Thomas Waller
 Fatty: Fatty George
 Fess: Fess Williams
 Fiddler: Claude "Fiddler" Williams
 First Lady (The): Ella Fitzgerald a.k.a. "the First Lady of Song"
 Flip: Flip Phillips,
 Foots: Walter "Foots" Thomas
 Fox (The): Maynard Ferguson
 Frog: Waldren Joseph
 Frog: Ben Webster
 Fud: Fud Livingston

G
 Gatemouth: Clarence Brown
 Gato: Gato Barbieri
 Gator: Willis Jackson
 Geechie: Geechie Fields
 Geechy: James Robinson (musician)
 Gigi: Gigi Gryce
 Ginger: Ginger Smock
 God: Art Tatum
 Goz: Conrad Gozzo
 Great Dane (The): Niels-Henning Ørsted Pedersen
 Great Dane with the Never-Ending Name (The): Niels-Henning Ørsted Pedersen
 Groaner (The): Bing Crosby
 Groove: Richard Holmes
 Guvnor (The): Ken Colyer

H
 Habao: Joe Texidor
 Half-Pint: Frankie Jaxon
 Ham: Leonard Davis
 Hammond: Johnny "Hammond" Smith
 Hamp or Mad Lionel: Lionel Hampton
 Hank: Hank Crawford
 Hannibal: Hannibal Lokumbe
 Happy: Happy Caldwell
 Happy: David "Happy" Williams
 Hawk: Coleman Hawkins a.k.a. "Bean"
 Hazy: Hazy Osterwald
 Hi De Ho: Cab Calloway
 High Priest, The: Ray Charles, a.k.a. "Brother Ray"
 High Priest of Bop Thelonious Monk
 High Priestess of Soul Nina Simone
 Hipster (The): Harry Gibson
 Hod: Hod O'Brien
 Hog: Leroy Cooper
 Honeybear: Gene Sedric
 Hootie: Jay McShann
 Horacee: Horace Arnold
 Hoss: Walter Page
 Hot Lips: Henry Busse
 Hot Lips or Lips: Oran Page
 Howdy: Howard "Howdy" Quicksell

I
 Iggy: Iggy Shevak
 Illinois: Illinois Jacquet
 Ivory: Herman Chittison
 Ivory: Harold Ivory Williams

J
 Jabali: Billy Hart
 Jabbo: Jabbo Smith
 Jaco: Jaco Pastorius
 Jack: Jack Jenney
 Jack: Jack Teagarden
 Jackie: Jackie McLean
 Jaki: Jaki Byard
 Jap: Jap Allen
 Jaws: Eddie "Lockjaw" Davis
 Jay: Jay Clayton
 Jay: Jay McShann a.k.a. "Hootie"
 Jef: Jef Gilson
 Jeep: Johnny Hodges a.k.a. "Rab" (short for "Rabbit")
 Jeepy: Branford Marsalis a.k.a. "Steepee"/"Steepy"
 Jelly Roll: Ferdinand Joseph La Menthe
 Jeru: Gerry Mulligan
 Jiggs: Jiggs Whigham
 Jiunie: Jiunie Booth
 Jiver: Jiver Hutchinson
 Joe Blade: Nick LaRocca
 Johnny Mac: John McLaughlin
 Josh: Josh Billings
 Judge: Milt Hinton
 Jug or Jughead: Gene Ammons
 Junior: Junior Cook
 Junior: Junior Mance
 Junior: Junior Raglin
 J. R.: J. R. Monterose

K
 Kaiser: Kaiser Marshall
 Kansas: Kansas Fields
 Kat: Herbert Cowans
 Keg: Keg Johnson
 Kermit: Kermit Driscoll
 Keter: Keter Betts
 Kid: Kid Howard
 Kid: Kid Ory
 Kid: Kid Rena
 Kid Sheik: Kid Sheik
 Kidd: Kidd Jordan
 King: Buddy Bolden
 King: Nat King Cole a.k.a. "Shorty Nadine"
 King: King Curtis
 King: King Fleming
 King: Freddie Keppard
 King: Joe Oliver a.k.a. "Papa Joe"
 King: King Pleasure
 King: King Watzke
 King Kolax: King Kolax
 King of the Clarinet: Artie Shaw
 King of Cool: Dean Martin
 King of Jazz: Paul Whiteman
 King of the Jazz Guitar: Django Reinhardt
 King of the Jukebox: Louis Jordan
 King of Swing: Benny Goodman a.k.a. "the Patriarch of the Clarinet", "the Professor", "Swing's Senior Statesman"
 Klook-Mop or Klook: Kenny Clarke
 Knife (The): Pepper Adams

L
 Lady Day: Billie Holiday
 Leap Frog: Buster Bennett
 Lion (The): Willie Smith
 Lips or Hot Lips: Oran Page
 Little: Benny Harris
 Little Bear: Chester Zardis
 Little Bird: Albert Ayler
 Little Bird: Jimmy Heath
 Little Brother: Little Brother Montgomery
 Little Giant: Johnny Griffin
 Little Jazz: Roy Eldridge
 Little Johnny C: Johnny Coles
 Little Man: Walter Buchanan
 Little Mitch: George Mitchell
 Lockjaw: Eddie "Lockjaw" Davis
 Long Tall Dexter: Dexter Gordon
 Lord: Chauncey "Lord" Westbrook
 Lovie: Lovie Austin
 Luckey: Luckey Roberts
 Lucky: Lucky Millinder
 Lucky: Eli Thompson

M
 Ma: Ma Rainey
 Mad Lionel: Lionel Hampton a.k.a. "Hamp"
 Maffy: Muvaffak "Maffy" Falay
 Maggie: Howard McGhee
 Maharaja: Oscar Peterson
 Major: Glenn Miller
 Man (The): Sam Taylor
 Manzie: Manzie Johnson
 Mash: Art Blakey
 Mex: Paul Gonsalves
 Mezz: Mezz Mezzrow
 Mick: Mick Mulligan
 Mickey: Mickey McMahan
 Midge: Midge Williams
 Miff: Miff Mole
 Mighty Flea (The): Gene Conners
 Miles: Miles Davis
 Min: Min Leibrook
 Minor: Minor Hall
 Mohawk: Ted Sturgis
 Money: Money Johnson
 Monk: Monk Hazel
 Monk: Monk McFay
 Monk: William Montgomery
 Montudie: Ed Garland
 Monty: Monty Waters
 Moonface, Wurmpth: Claude Thornhill
 Mouse: Irving Randolph
 Mousie or Mousey: Elmer Alexander
 Mr. Bongo: Jack Costanzo
 Mr. Clock: Freddie Green
 Mr. Five by Five: Jimmy Rushing
 Mr. Lead: Derek Watkins
 Mr. T: Stanley Turrentine aka "The Sugar Man"
 Muffin, The Lamb: Donald Lambert
 Muggsy: Muggsy Spanier
 Mule: Major Holley
 Munn: Munn Ware
 Mutt: Tom Carey a.k.a. "Papa Mutt"

N
 Nappy: Earle Howard 
 Nappy: Hilton Lamare
 Nature Boy: J. T. Brown aka "Blow It" Brown
 Newark Flash: Wayne Shorter
 Newk: Sonny Rollins
 NHØP: Niels-Henning Ørsted Pedersen
 Nick: Nick LaRocca

O
 O Bruxo (The Sorcerer): Hermeto Pascoal
 Ol' Blue Eyes: Frank Sinatra a.k.a. "The Voice"
 Ool-Ya-Koo: Willie Cook
 Osie: Osie Johnson

P
 Panama: Panama Francis
 Pancho: Kenny Hagood
 Papa: Papa Celestin
 Papa: Louis "Papa" Tio
 Papa Jack: Papa Jack Laine
 Papa Jo: Jonathan David Samuel Jones
 Papa Joe: Joe "King" Oliver
 Papa Mutt: Thomas Carey a.k.a. Mutt Carey
 Pat: Pat Patrick
 Patriarch of the Clarinet (the): Benny Goodman a.k.a. "the Professor", "Swing's Senior Statesman", "the King of Swing"
 Peanuts: Peanuts Holland
 Peanuts: Peanuts Hucko
 Peck: Peck Kelley
 Pee Wee: H. B. Barnum
 Pee Wee: Alfred "Pee Wee" Ellis
 Pee Wee: Pee Wee Erwin
 Pee Wee: Pee Wee Hunt
 Pee Wee: Pee Wee Russell
 Pee Wee: Leon "Pee Wee" Whittaker
 Pepper: Pepper Adams a.k.a. "the Knife"
 Pete: Pete Candoli
 Pete: Pete Johnson
 Pha: Pha Terrell
 : Farrell Sanders
 Phantom: Joe Henderson
 Philly Joe: Joseph Jones
 Pinetop: Pinetop Perkins (Joseph William Perkins)
 Pinetop: Clarence Smith a.k.a. "Pine Top"
 Polo: Polo Barnes
 Pony: Norwood Poindexter
 Pops: Sidney Bechet
 Pops: Louis Armstrong a.k.a. "Satchel Mouth", "Satchmo", "Dipper Mouth"
 Pops: George Murphy "Pops" Foster
 Pops: Robert Popwell
 Porky: Al Porcino
 Pretty: Bernard Purdie
 Pres (preferred spelling) or Prez (short for "President"): Lester Young
 Prince of Darkness: Miles Davis
 Professor, the: Cab Calloway
 Professor (the): Benny Goodman a.k.a. "the Patriarch of the Clarinet", "Swing's Senior Statesman", "the King of Swing"
 Pud: Pud Brown 
 Punch: Punch Miller

Q
 Queen: Peggy Lee
 Queen of the Jukeboxes: Dinah Washington

R
 Rabbit: Johnny Hodges a.k.a. "Rab", "Jeep"
 Rap: Leon Roppolo
 Ray: Ray Bryant
 Reb: Reb Spikes
 Red: Red Allen
 Red: Red Balaban
 Red: Tom Brown
 Red: Red Callender
 Red: Red Garland
 Red: Red Holloway
 Red: Red Ingle
 Red: Red McKenzie
 Red: Keith Moore "Red" Mitchell
 Red: Robert Muse
 Red: Red Nichols
 Red: Red Norvo
 Red: Red Prysock
 Red: Red Richards
 Red: Red Saunders
 Red: Alvin Tyler
 Red Rodney: Red Rodney
 Rosy: Rosy McHargue
 Rusty: Rusty Bryant
 Rusty: Lyle Dedrick
 Rusty: Rusty Jones

S
 Sabby: Sabby Lewis
 Santy: Santy Runyon
 Sassy: Sarah Vaughan a.k.a. "The Divine One"
 Satchmo: Louis Armstrong a.k.a. "Dipper Mouth", "Pops", "Satchel Mouth" 
 Sax: Sax Mallard
 Scoops: Scoops Carey
 Scotty: Howard "Scotty" Scott
 Scotty: Kermit Scott
 Scrappy: Scrappy Lambert
 Senator (the): Eugene Wright
 Shadow: Rossiere Wilson
 Shake: Shake Keane
 Sharkey: Joseph Bonano
 Shifty: Shifty Henry
 Shorty: Harold Baker
 Shorty: Shorty Rogers
 Shorty: Shorty Sherock
 Sippie: Sippie Wallace
 Sir: Sir Charles Thompson
 Sir James: Jimmy Nottingham
 Skeeter: Clifton Best
 Skeets: Skeets Herfurt
 Skeets: Skeets Tolbert
 Skip: Skip Martin
 Skippy: Skippy Williams
 Skitch: Skitch Henderson
 Slam: Slam Stewart
 Slats: Slats Long
 Sleepy Hall: Chick Bullock
 Slide: Slide Hampton
 Slim: Bulee Gaillard
 Slim: Alton Moore
 Slow Drag: Alcide Pavageau
 Smack: Fletcher Henderson
 Smith: Smith Ballew
 Smitty: Marvin Smith
 Snakehips: Ken Snakehips Johnson
 Snap Crackle: Roy Haynes
 Snub: Snub Mosley
 Sonny: Sonny Berman
 Sonny: Sonny Blount
 Sonny: Sonny Brown
 Sonny: Sonny Clark
 Sonny: Sonny Clay
 Sonny: Sonny Cohn
 Sonny: Sonny Criss
 Sonny: Sonny Dallas
 Sonny: Sonny Dunham
 Sonny: Sonny Greer
 Sonny: Sonny Henry
 Sonny: Clarence "Sonny" Henry
 Sonny: Sonny Igoe
 Sonny: Sonny Lester
 Sonny: Sonny Parker
 Sonny: Sonny Payne
 Sonny: Sonny Rollins a.k.a. "Newk"
 Sonny: Sonny Russo
 Sonny: Sonny Sharrock
 Sonny: Sonny Simmons
 Sonny: Edward Stitt
 Sonny: Sonny White
 Sound (the): Stan Getz
 Spanky: Spanky Davis
 Spanky: Spanky DeBrest
 Specs: Gordon Powell
 Specs: Specs Wright
 Spider: Cyril Haynes
 Spike: Spike Heatley
 Spike: Spike Hughes
 Spike: Spike Robinson
 Spike: Spike Wells
 Spoon: Jimmy Witherspoon
 Spud: Spud Murphy
 Stan: Stan Hasselgård
 Steepee (Steepy): Branford Marsalis a.k.a. "Jeepy"
 Stix: Stix Hooper
 Stork (the): Paul Desmond
 Stuff: Stuff Combe
 Stuff: Stuff Smith
 Stump: Stump Evans
 Stumpy: Stumpy Brady
 Sunny: Sunny Murray
 Swee' Pea: Billy Strayhorn
 Sweets: Harry Edison
 Swing's Senior Statesman: Benny Goodman a.k.a. "the Patriarch of the Clarinet", "the Professor", "the King of Swing"
 Sy: Sy Oliver

T
 Tab: Tab Smith
 Tain: Jeff "Tain" Watts
 Teddy: Teddy Brannon
 Teddy: Teddy Kleindin
 Teddy: Teddy Stauffer
 Teo: Teo Macero
 Terry: Terry Gibbs
 Tex: Tex Beneke
 Tex: Herschel Evans
 The Ghost: Earl Washington
 The Sugar Man: Stanley Turrentine aka "Mr. T"
 Tiger: Tiger Haynes
 Tina: Tina Brooks
 Tiny: Tiny Davis
 Tiny: Tiny Grimes
 Tiny: Tiny Hill
 Tiny: Tiny Kahn
 Tiny: Tiny Parham
 Tiny: Tiny Taylor
 Tiny: Tiny Winters
 Tito: Tito Burns
 Toby: Scoville Browne
 Toby: Otto Hardwick
 Tom: Tom Archia
 Tootie: Albert "Tootie" Heath
 Toots: Toots Mondello
 Toots: Toots Thielemans
 Tram: Frank Trumbauer
 Trane: John Coltrane
 Tricky Sam: Joe Nanton
 Truck: Truck Parham
 Trummy: Trummy Young
 Trump: Trump Davidson
 Tubby: Tubby Hall
 Tubby: Tubby Hayes a.k.a. "Tubbs"
 Tuff: Tuff Green
 Turk: Turk Murphy
 Turk: Turk Van Lake
 Tuts: Tuts Washington
 Tutti: Tutti Camarata

V
 Velvet Fog (The): Mel Tormé
 Vice Prez: Paul Quinichette
 Voice (The): Frank Sinatra a.k.a. "Ol' Blue Eyes"
 Vonski: Von Freeman

W
 Wah Wah: Wah Wah Watson
 Wes: Wes Montgomery
 Whitey: Gordon "Whitey" Mitchell
 Wig (The): Gerald Wiggins
 Wild: Wild Bill Davis
 Wild: Bill Davison
 Wingy: Joseph Manone
 Wooden: Wooden Joe Nicholas

Y
 Yank: Yank Lawson
 Yardbird: Charlie Parker a.k.a. "Bird"
 Yellow: Alcide Nunez

Z
 Ziggy: Ziggy Elman
 Zinky: Zinky Cohn
 Zoot: Jack Sims
 Zutty: Zutty Singleton

See also

Jazz royalty
List of best-selling music artists
List of honorific titles in popular music
List of stage names
List of nicknames of blues musicians
Lists of nicknames – nickname list articles on Wikipedia

References

Jazz culture
Lists of jazz musicians
Jazz
Jazz